The Vietnam Museum of Revolution was a museum in Hanoi, Vietnam. It is now part of the Vietnam National Museum of History.

Located in the Tong Dan area of the city, it was established in August 1959 in a two-story building, formerly used by the Trade Department of Vietnam. It was redesigned into 30 galleries, and as of 2008 contains in excess of 40,000 historical exhibits.

References

 Explore One Viet Nam

Museums established in 1959
History museums in Vietnam
Museums in Hanoi
French colonial architecture in Vietnam
1959 establishments in Vietnam